Sodium tetrafluoroborate is an inorganic compound with formula NaBF4. It is a salt that forms colorless or white water-soluble rhombic crystals and is soluble in water (108 g/100 mL) but less soluble in organic solvents.

Sodium tetrafluoroborate is used in some fluxes used for brazing and to produce boron trifluoride.

Preparation
Sodium tetrafluoroborate can be prepared by neutralizing tetrafluoroboric acid with sodium carbonate or sodium hydroxide.
NaOH + HBF4 →   NaBF4  +  H2O
Na2CO3  +  2 HBF4  →  2 NaBF4  +  H2O  +  CO2

Alternatively the chemical can be synthesized from boric acid, hydrofluoric acid, and sodium carbonate:

2H3BO3 + 8HF + Na2CO3 → 2NaBF4 + 7H2O + CO2

Reactions and uses
On heating to its melting point, sodium tetrafluoroborate decomposes to sodium fluoride and boron trifluoride:
NaBF4   →   NaF  +  BF3
It is a source of tetrafluoroborate anion, which is used in organic chemistry for the preparation of salts.  Sodium tetrafluoroborate can be used for synthesis of ionic liquids, where tetrafluoroborate is the anion.

References

Tetrafluoroborates
Sodium compounds
Brazing and soldering